The Branson School of Entrepreneurship (aka Branson Centre of Entrepreneurship) is a charitable organization that provides entrepreneurial training and financial support to international youth.

History
The Branson School of Entrepreneurship (BSE) was founded in 2006 as partnership between Taddy Blecher  and Richard Branson in Johannesburg, South Africa as part of the non-profit foundation, Virgin Unite. By 2009 the school had given financial mentoring and training to 4,100 students. The school's managing director was James Wanjohi and
Virgin Unite was considering additional schools in the United States, Britain and Kenya at that time. In January Branson visited the school to give awards and recognition to selected students.

Beginning in 2011 the BSE became known as the Branson Centre of Entrepreneurship with Judi Sandrock as its executive director. In September, Branson opened a branch in Montego Bay, Jamaica.

Description
The school's goal is to stimulate local economies by training and mentoring disadvantaged youth. As of 2006, BSE training was part of the curriculum at CIDA City Campus serving 800 youths per year.  The BSE provides financial support, in the form of "seed money" loans, for the most well conceived business plans of each class.

References

External links

The Profitable Expat Website
Branson Centre of Entrepreneurship
What Is A Search Fund & How Does It Work?

Entrepreneurship organizations
Universities in Jamaica
Business schools in South Africa
Education in Johannesburg
Educational institutions established in 2006
2006 establishments in South Africa